David Yu (born 6 November 1967) is the former chief executive officer of Internet betting exchange Betfair and a tech investor.

Education and early career
Yu studied computer science at UC Berkeley and Stanford. He moved to London from California in 2000 at the behest of his employer Alta Vista.

Betfair
He became chief technology officer of Betfair in 2001. He was promoted to the position of CEO in January 2006 during a turbulent time for the company that saw the shakeup of the positions of CEO and Chairman with Sir Robert Horton being forced out as Chairman.  As an IT guy, Yu's promotion to the helm was unusual. He took the company public on the London Stock Exchange in October 2010. David Yu stood down as CEO and from the Board on 31 December 2011 after a 60% drop in share value in the year after listing and the subsequent appointment of Breon Corcoran as his replacement.

Tech investor
He is an early stage tech investor. He was among a group of individual investors and firms that invested seed money in TransferWise, a payment transfer company.

References

External links
Interview with Silicon.com
Video of TechCrunch interview
Succession process for CEO of Betfair to begin

1967 births
American computer businesspeople
British chief executives
American people of Chinese descent
American technology chief executives
American expatriates in England
Gambling in the United Kingdom
Living people
American chief technology officers
UC Berkeley College of Engineering alumni
Stanford University alumni